Miyama Dam is an asphalt dam located in Tochigi prefecture in Japan. The dam is used for irrigation, water supply and power production. The catchment area of the dam is 65.9 km2. The dam impounds about 97  ha of land when full and can store 25800 thousand cubic meters of water. The construction of the dam was started on 1968 and completed in 1973.

References

Dams in Tochigi Prefecture
1973 establishments in Japan